Mesocricetibacter is a genus of bacteria from the family of Pasteurellaceae with one known species (Mesocricetibacter intestinalis). Mesocricetibacter intestinalis has been isolated from the caecitis of the hamster (Mesocricetus auratus).

References

Pasteurellales
Bacteria genera
Monotypic bacteria genera